Mary Joachina Yee (née Mary Joachina Ygnacio Rowe; 1897–1965) was a Barbareño Chumash linguist. She was the last first-language speaker of the Barbareño language, a member of the Chumashan languages that were once spoken in southern California by the Chumash people.

Biography 
Yee was born in 1897 in an adobe house near Santa Barbara, California, the home of her grandmother. In the late 1890s, Yee was one of only a handful of children brought up to speak any Chumash language. She memorized several old Chumash stories.
  
In her fifties, Yee began to take part in the analysis, description, and documentation of her language, for many years working closely with the linguist John Peabody Harrington, who had also worked with Yee's mother Lucretia García and her grandmother Luisa Ignacio. Yee and Harrington corresponded with each other in Chumash. After retiring in 1954, Yee worked with Harrington nearly every day. She also worked with linguist Madison S. Beeler. Over the course of her work she became a linguist in her own right, analyzing paradigms and word structure.

Yee's story appears in the documentary film, 6 Generations: A Chumash Family History (2010) which was co-written by her daughter Ernestine Ygnacio-De Soto. Posthumously, she published a children's book, The Sugar Bear Story (2005), illustrated by her daughter Ernestine Ygnacio-De Soto.

Publication

See also
List of last known speakers of languages

References

External links 

 Image collection: Native Americans on the Central Coast from OAC include photos of Yee, her mother, grandmother, and extended family and tribe

1897 births
1965 deaths
Linguists from the United States
Women linguists
Native American linguists
Last known speakers of a Native American language
Chumash people
People from Santa Barbara, California
20th-century linguists
Linguists of Chumashan languages
Native American people from California
20th-century Native American women
20th-century Native Americans